The South Mississippi State Hospital (SMSH) is an acute care regional psychiatric facility of the Mississippi Department of Mental Health located in unincorporated Lamar County, Mississippi, near Purvis. The institution's Crisis Intervention Center is in Laurel.

In its 1995 session, the Mississippi State Legislature passed  House Bill 960, authorizing the construction of the facility. The hospital, a regional center, serves Covington, Forrest, Greene, Jefferson Davis, Jones, Lamar, Marion, Perry, and Wayne counties.

References

External links

Buildings and structures in Lamar County, Mississippi
Psychiatric hospitals in Mississippi
Hospitals established in the 1990s